GEMMA is a magazine and a social group founded in 1976 whose mandate is to provide a "friendship and support group for disabled lesbians in England".

The organisation was founded by members of lesbian organisation Sappho and mixed organisation Campaign for Homosexual Equality, including Elsa Beckett. Gemma's member newsletter was published in regular print, in braille as well as cassette format.

In her essay Unearthing Our Past: Engaging with Diversity at the Museum of London, Raminder Kaur describes a leaflet promoting the activities of Gemma, which is a part of the Museum of London collection, as "crucial to exploring the theme of multiple identities or difference within difference".

See also

 List of lesbian periodicals

References

Disability and sexuality
Disability mass media
LGBT-related magazines published in England
Lesbian-related magazines
LGBT history in the United Kingdom
LGBT organisations in England
Magazines established in 1976
Lesbian organisations based in the United Kingdom